Fabio Bianchetti is a member of the International Skating Union Technical Committee. He took the Judge's Oath at the 2006 Winter Olympics Opening Ceremony.

He is the son of Sonia Bianchetti, also a long-time former ISU official.

References
IOC 2006 Winter Olympics

Year of birth missing (living people)
Living people
Figure skating officials
Italian sportspeople
Olympic officials
Oath takers at the Olympic Games
Place of birth missing (living people)
21st-century Italian people